Andres Ehin (14 March 1940 – 10 December 2011) was an Estonian writer and translator. In 1964 he graduated from University of Tartu, studying Estonian philology (especially Finno-Ugric studies). From 1972 to 1974 he was the senior scientific editor of Estonian Soviet Encyclopaedia. From 1972 he was a member of Estonian Writers' Union. From 1968 to 1989 he was a member of Communist Party. In 1990 he joined Estonian Social Democratic Party.

He married Ly Seppel (Ehin). Their daughter is poet Kristiina Ehin.

He died in 2011 and was buried in Pärnamäe Cemetery in Tallinn.

Works
 1995: poetry collection Teadvus on ussinahk (Consciousness is Snakeskin)
 2000: poetry collection Alateadvus on alatasa purjus (The Unconscious is Frequently Drunk)
 1996: novel Rummu Jüri mälestused (The Memoirs of Rummu Jüri)

References

External links

Andres Ehin at Estonian Writers' Online Dictionary

1940 births
2011 deaths
Estonian male poets
Estonian male novelists
20th-century Estonian writers
21st-century Estonian writers
20th-century Estonian poets
21st-century Estonian poets
Estonian translators
Estonian editors
University of Tartu alumni
Writers from Tallinn
Burials at Pärnamäe Cemetery